Lutopecny is a municipality and village in Kroměříž District in the Zlín Region of the Czech Republic. It has about 600 inhabitants.

Administrative parts
The village of Měrůtky is an administrative part of Lutopecny.

Notable people
Alois Šiška (1914–2003), World War II pilot

References

Villages in Kroměříž District